The following outline is provided as an overview of and topical guide to Uruguay:

Uruguay – sovereign country located in southeastern South America.  It is home to 3.46 million people, of which 1.7 million live in the capital Montevideo and its metropolitan area. Montevideo was founded by the Spanish in the early 18th century as a military stronghold. Uruguay won its independence in 1825-1828 following a three-way struggle between Spain, Argentina and Brazil. It is a constitutional democracy, where the president fulfills the roles of both head of state and head of government. The economy is largely based on agriculture (making up 10% of GDP and the most substantial export) and the state sector,  Uruguay's economy is on the whole more stable than in its surrounding states, and it maintains a solid reputation with investors.

General reference

 Pronunciation:
 Common English country name:  Uruguay
 Official English country name:  The Oriental Republic of Uruguay
 Common endonym(s): Uruguay 
 Official endonym(s): República Oriental del Uruguay
 Adjectival(s): Uruguayan
 Demonym(s): Oriental, Uruguayan
 Etymology: Name of Uruguay
 International rankings of Uruguay
 ISO country codes:  UY, URY, 858
 ISO region codes:  See ISO 3166-2:UY
 Internet country code top-level domain:  .uy

Geography of Uruguay

Geography of Uruguay
 Uruguay is: a country
 Location:
 Southern Hemisphere
 Western Hemisphere
 Latin America
 South America
 Southern Cone
 Time zone:  UTC-03
 Extreme points of Uruguay
 High:  Cerro Catedral 
 Low:  South Atlantic Ocean 0 m
 Land boundaries:  1,648 km
 1,068 km
 580 km
 Coastline:  South Atlantic Ocean 660 km
 Population of Uruguay: 3,340,000  - 132nd most populous country
 Area of Uruguay: 176,215 km2
 Atlas of Uruguay

Environment of Uruguay

 Climate of Uruguay
 Renewable energy in Uruguay
 Geology of Uruguay
 Protected areas of Uruguay
 National parks of Uruguay
 Wildlife of Uruguay
 Fauna of Uruguay
 Birds of Uruguay
 Mammals of Uruguay

Natural geographic features of Uruguay

 Fjords of Uruguay: none
 Glaciers of Uruguay: none
 Islands of Uruguay
 Lakes of Uruguay
 Mountains of Uruguay
 Volcanoes in Uruguay: none
 Rivers of Uruguay
 Valleys of Uruguay
 World Heritage Sites in Uruguay: Colonia del Sacramento

Regions of Uruguay

Regions of Uruguay

Ecoregions of Uruguay

List of ecoregions in Uruguay

Demography of Uruguay

Demographics of Uruguay

Government and politics of Uruguay

Politics of Uruguay
 Form of government: presidential representative democratic republic
 Capital of Uruguay: Montevideo
 Elections in Uruguay
 Political parties in Uruguay

Branches of the government of Uruguay

Government of Uruguay

Executive branch of the government of Uruguay
 Head of state: President of Uruguay,
 Head of government: President of Uruguay,
 Cabinet of Uruguay

Legislative branch of the government of Uruguay

 Parliament of Uruguay (bicameral)
 Upper house: Senate of Uruguay
 Lower house: Chamber of Deputies of Uruguay

Judicial branch of the government of Uruguay

Court system of Uruguay
 Supreme Court of Uruguay

Foreign relations of Uruguay

Foreign relations of Uruguay
 Diplomatic missions in Uruguay
 Diplomatic missions of Uruguay

International organization membership
The Eastern Republic of Uruguay is a member of:

Agency for the Prohibition of Nuclear Weapons in Latin America and the Caribbean (OPANAL)
Andean Community of Nations (CAN) (associate)
Food and Agriculture Organization (FAO)
Group of 77 (G77)
Inter-American Development Bank (IADB)
International Atomic Energy Agency (IAEA)
International Bank for Reconstruction and Development (IBRD)
International Chamber of Commerce (ICC)
International Civil Aviation Organization (ICAO)
International Criminal Court (ICCt)
International Criminal Police Organization (Interpol)
International Development Association (IDA)
International Federation of Red Cross and Red Crescent Societies (IFRCS)
International Finance Corporation (IFC)
International Fund for Agricultural Development (IFAD)
International Hydrographic Organization (IHO)
International Labour Organization (ILO)
International Maritime Organization (IMO)
International Monetary Fund (IMF)
International Olympic Committee (IOC)
International Organization for Migration (IOM)
International Organization for Standardization (ISO)
International Red Cross and Red Crescent Movement (ICRM)
International Telecommunication Union (ITU)
International Telecommunications Satellite Organization (ITSO)
Inter-Parliamentary Union (IPU)
Latin American Economic System (LAES)
Latin American Integration Association (LAIA)
Multilateral Investment Guarantee Agency (MIGA)

Nonaligned Movement (NAM) (observer)
Organisation for the Prohibition of Chemical Weapons (OPCW)
Organization of American States (OAS)
Permanent Court of Arbitration (PCA)
Rio Group (RG)
Southern Cone Common Market (Mercosur)
Unión Latina
Union of South American Nations (UNASUR)
United Nations (UN)
United Nations Conference on Trade and Development (UNCTAD)
United Nations Educational, Scientific, and Cultural Organization (UNESCO)
United Nations Industrial Development Organization (UNIDO)
United Nations Military Observer Group in India and Pakistan (UNMOGIP)
United Nations Mission for the Referendum in Western Sahara (MINURSO)
United Nations Mission in the Sudan (UNMIS)
United Nations Observer Mission in Georgia (UNOMIG)
United Nations Operation in Cote d'Ivoire (UNOCI)
United Nations Organization Mission in the Democratic Republic of the Congo (MONUC)
United Nations Stabilization Mission in Haiti (MINUSTAH)
Universal Postal Union (UPU)
World Confederation of Labour (WCL)
World Customs Organization (WCO)
World Federation of Trade Unions (WFTU)
World Health Organization (WHO)
World Intellectual Property Organization (WIPO)
World Meteorological Organization (WMO)
World Tourism Organization (UNWTO)
World Trade Organization (WTO)

Law and order in Uruguay

Law of Uruguay

 Cannabis in Uruguay
 Constitution of Uruguay
 Human rights in Uruguay
 LGBT rights in Uruguay
 Freedom of religion in Uruguay
 National Police of Uruguay

Military of Uruguay

Military of Uruguay
 Command
 Commander-in-chief:
 Forces
 Army of Uruguay
 Navy of Uruguay
 Air Force of Uruguay

Local government in Uruguay

Local government in Uruguay

History of Uruguay

History of Uruguay

History of Uruguay, by period or event 
 Indigenous peoples of Uruguay
 Charrúa people
 Guarani people
 Spanish colonization of the Americas
 Viceroyalty of the Río de la Plata (1776–1814)
 Banda Oriental
 British invasions of the Río de la Plata (1806–1807)
 Liga Federal (1815–1820)
 Cisplatina (1821–1828)
 Thirty-Three Orientals
 Treaty of Montevideo (1828)
 Uruguayan Civil War (1839–1851)
 Uruguayan War (1864–1865)
 Paraguayan War 1864–1870
 Revolution of the Lances (1870–1872)
 Battle of Masoller (1904)
 Batllism
 Tupamaros
 Civic-military dictatorship of Uruguay (1973–1985)
 Law on the Expiration of the Punitive Claims of the State (1986)

History of Uruguay, by region

History of Uruguay, by subject

Culture of Uruguay

Culture of Uruguay
 Cuisine of Uruguay
 Disability in Uruguay
 Languages of Uruguay
 National symbols of Uruguay
 Coat of arms of Uruguay
 Flag of Uruguay
 National anthem of Uruguay
 Orders, decorations, and medals of Uruguay: the decorations granted by the Uruguayan authorities to distinguish persons or organizations due to meritory services or achievements.
 Civilian decorations:
 Medal of the Oriental Republic of Uruguay: a decoration granted to foreign individuals due to reciprocity reasons and diplomatic relationships. 
 Delmira Agustini Medal: granted to local or foreign individuals to distinguish their work and contribution to further improve the culture.
 Order of Sports Merit: this decoration acknowledges individuals whose relevant merits or career path related to sports, locally or internationally, contributed with the development of the sports in Uruguay, and also to individuals who contributed with international covenants related to sports.
 Military decorations:
 Medal of Military Merit: highest military award related to the Army of Uruguay, that awards civilian and military individuals, Uruguayan or foreign, and also to military units or institutions, due to meritory services or relevant contributions to the Army of Uruguay, and also for exceptional performance in combat in the case of military units.
 Medal of Aeronautical Merit: highest military award related to the Uruguayan Air Force, that awards civilian and military individuals, Uruguayan or foreign, for their outstanding services in benefit of the Uruguayan Air Force or the national aviation.
 Decoration Honor of Naval Merit Commander Peter Campbell: highest military award related to the Navy of Uruguay, that acknowledges civilian and military individuals, Uruguayan or foreign, and also to military units and Uruguayan or foreign institutions, for their outstanding services or relevant works served to the Uruguayan Navy.
 18 May 1811 Medal: second award in Army decorations hierarchy, to acknowledge meritory services to the Uruguayan Army.
 15 November 1817 Medal: second award in Navy decorations hierarchy, to distinguish civilian and military individuals, military units or institutions, for their merits related to the Navy.
 Medal of Military Valor: third award in Army decorations hierarchy, to recognize heroic or valor in actions performed in duty.
 Decoration General José Artigas Leader of the Orientals: decoration by the Staff of Defense office to distinguish individuals who contributed with their services to the Ministry of Defense, Staff of Defense office or to the branches of Armed Forces in general.
 People of Uruguay
 Prostitution in Uruguay
 Public holidays in Uruguay
 Religion in Uruguay
 Christianity in Uruguay
Roman Catholic Church in Uruguay
 Hinduism in Uruguay
 Islam in Uruguay
 Judaism in Uruguay
Bahá'í Faith in Uruguay
 World Heritage Sites in Uruguay

Art in Uruguay
 Cinema of Uruguay
 Literature of Uruguay
 Music of Uruguay
 Television in Uruguay

Sports in Uruguay

Sports in Uruguay
 Football in Uruguay
 Uruguay at the Olympics

Economy and infrastructure of Uruguay

Economy of Uruguay
 Economic rank, by nominal GDP (2007): 86th (eighty-sixth)
 Agriculture in Uruguay
 Banking in Uruguay
 Central Bank of Uruguay
 Communications in Uruguay
 Internet in Uruguay
 Companies of Uruguay
Currency of Uruguay: Peso
ISO 4217: UYU
 Energy in Uruguay
 Energy policy of Uruguay
 Nuclear energy in Uruguay
 Health care in Uruguay
 Mining in Uruguay
 Uruguay Stock Exchange
 Tourism in Uruguay
 Transport in Uruguay
 Airports in Uruguay
 Rail transport in Uruguay
 Roads in Uruguay
 Water supply and sanitation in Uruguay

Education in Uruguay
 Education in Uruguay: under the principles of compulsory, secular and free education of the public education institutions since 1876. The system comprises pre-primary education (compulsory from 4 year-old children), compulsory primary education, compulsory lower and higher secondary education, and voluntary tertiary education (university and not university).
 Universities in Uruguay: 
 Public: University of the Republic, Technological University of Uruguay.
 Private: ORT University, University of the Enterprise, Catholic University, University of Montevideo, CLAEH University.

See also
Uruguay
Index of Uruguay-related articles
List of international rankings
Member state of the United Nations
Outline of geography
Outline of South America

References

External links

 General
 Uruguay. The World Factbook. Central Intelligence Agency.
 Country profile of Uruguay by BBC News

 Maps

 Maps of Uruguay at WorldAtlas.com

Uruguay
 1